Napolioni Qasevakatini (born 17 March 1993) is a Fijian footballer who plays as a striker for Nadi F.C.

International career

International goals
Scores and results list Fiji's goal tally first.

References

External links
 

Living people
1993 births
Association football forwards
Fiji international footballers
Fijian footballers
Nadi F.C. players
Suva F.C. players